The 1987 New York Jets season was the 28th season for the team and the club's 18th season in the National Football League (NFL). It began with the team trying to improve upon its 10–6 record from 1986 under head coach Joe Walton. The season was marred by a players' strike that resulted in the cancellation of all Week 3 games, as well as Weeks 4 through 6 being played mostly with replacement players. The Jets finished the season with a record of 6–9. For the second time in his career, Ken O'Brien had the lowest rate of interceptions among quarterbacks. He had 8 interceptions in 393 passing attempts.

Offseason

NFL draft

Personnel

NFL replacement players
After the league decided to use replacement players during the NFLPA strike, the following team was assembled:

Roster

Regular season

Schedule

Note: Intra-division opponents are in bold text.

Season summary

Week 1

Week 2

Week 3

Week 4

Week 5

Week 6

Week 7

Week 8

Week 9

Week 10

Week 11

Week 12

Week 13

Week 14

Week 15

Standings

Awards and records
Johnny Hector, Led AFC, Touchdowns, 11 TD's

References

External links
1987 statistics

New York Jets seasons
New York Jets
New York Jets season
20th century in East Rutherford, New Jersey
Meadowlands Sports Complex